Giovanni "Ninetto" Davoli (born 11 October 1948) is an Italian actor who became known through his roles in several of Pier Paolo Pasolini's films.

Biography
Davoli was born in San Pietro a Maida, Calabria. He was discovered by poet, novelist and film director Pier Paolo Pasolini, then 43, who had begun a relationship with Davoli, then a 15-year-old boy, in 1963. Pasolini considered him to be "the great love of his life", and he later cast him in his 1966 film Uccellacci e uccellini (literally Bad Birds and Little Birds but translated in English as The Hawks and the Sparrows),  co-starred with celebrated comic Totò, Pasolini became the youth's mentor and friend. "Even though their sexual relations lasted only a few years, Ninetto continued to live with Pasolini and was his constant companion, as well as appearing in six more of his films."

First cast in a non-speaking role in the film Il vangelo secondo Matteo (The Gospel According to St. Matthew, 1964), Davoli played mostly comical-naïve roles in several more of Pasolini's films, the last of which was Il fiore delle Mille e una Notte (A Thousand and One Nights/Arabian Nights, 1974).

The Trilogy of Life was made at a harsh junction in the lives of Davoli and Pasolini. It was during the filming of The Canterbury Tales that Davoli left Pasolini to marry a woman. Behind the scenes, this ruined Pasolini's mood and he began composing nihilistic and angry poetry. For his next film Arabian Nights Pasolini did with Davoli what he had never done in a previous film, he showed Davoli's naked genitalia on screen. It is in this film that Davoli's character Aziz is a very selfish and unfeeling man whose rejection of a woman causes her death and which results in his own castration on screen. Pasolini's own hurt feelings are very evident here in what is for the most part a lighthearted fantasy film.

After Pasolini's death in 1975, Davoli turned increasingly to television productions.

In May 2015, Davoli was announced as recipient of a special Nastro d'Argento Career Award.

Selected filmography

Film

Il vangelo secondo Matteo (The Gospel According to St. Matthew, 1964, Pasolini) - Pastore con bambino (uncredited)
Uccellacci e uccellini (The Hawks and the Sparrows, 1966, Pasolini) - Innocenti Ninetto / Brother Ninetto
Le streghe (1967, Pasolini) - Baciu Miao (segment "La terra vista dalla luna")
Requiescant (1967) - El Niño
Edipo re (Oedipus Rex, 1967, Pasolini) - Angelo
Caprice Italian Style (1968, Pasolini) - Othello (segment "Che cosa sono le nuvole?")
Teorema (Theorem, 1968, Pasolini) - Angelino - the Messenger
Partner (1968) - Student
Amore e rabbia (1969, Pasolini) - Riccetto (segment "La sequenza del fiore di carta")
Porcile (Pigsty, 1969, Pasolini) - Maracchione
Ostia (1970) - Fiorino
Il Decameron (The Decameron, 1971, Pasolini) - Andreuccio of Perugia
Er Più – storia d'amore e di coltello (1971) - Antonio Cerino, aka 'Totarello'
Shadows Unseen (1972) - Giorgio the Pusher
I Racconti di Canterbury (The Canterbury Tales, 1972, Pasolini) - Perkin
S.P.Q.R. (1972)
Storia di fifa e di coltello - er seguito del più (1972) - 'Totarello' Meniconi
Il maschio ruspante (1972) - Walter
Anche se volessi lavorare, che faccio? (1972) - Riccetto
Maria Rosa la guardona (1973) - Romolo
La Tosca (1973) - Ussano Nero
Storia de fratelli e de cortelli (1973) - Riccetto
Storie scellerate (1973) - Bernardino
La signora è stata violentata (1973) - Palla - il fattorino
Unbelievable Adventures of Italians in Russia (1974) - Giuseppe
 Pasqualino Cammarata, Frigate Captain (1974) - Otello Meniconi
Il fiore delle Mille e una Notte (A Thousand and One Nights/Arabian Nights, 1974, Pasolini) - Aziz
Appassionata (1974) - Butcher's Boy
Amore mio, non farmi male (1974) - Giovanni 'Ninetto' Procacci
Il lumacone (1974) - Ginetto
Qui comincia l'avventura (1975) - Il saltimbanco / l'angelo / il diavolo
Il vizio ha le calze nere (1975) - Sandro Lucetti
Frankenstein all'italiana (1975) - Igor
L'agnese va a morire (1976) - La disperata
Spogliamoci, così senza pudor (1976) - Pietro, Thief (Segment "L'armadio Di Troia")
Amore all'arrabbiata (1976) - Ninetto De Terenzi
Death Hunt (1977) - Mario
Casotto (1977) - Il fotografo
Malabestia (1978) - Filippo Diotallevi
La liceale seduce i professori (1979) - Arturo
Maschio.. femmina... fiore... frutto (1979) - Donato - un militare
Good News (1979) - Fattorino
Il cappotto di Astrakan (1980)
Il minestrone (1981) - Giovanni
The Tyrant's Heart (1981) - Filippo
Il conte Tacchia (1982) - Ninetto
Occhei, occhei (1983) - Prete
 (1985) - Bettler am Brunnen
Momo (1986) - Nino
A proposito di Roma (1987)
Animali metropolitani (1987) - Spartaco Scorcelletti
Le rose blu (1996)
La ragazza del metrò (1989) - Donato
Le rose blu (1989) - La guardia carceraria
L'anno prossimo vado a letto alle dieci (1995) - Il Tenente
I magi randagi (1996) - Amico di Giuseppe
Cinématon #1824 (1997)
Una vita non violenta (1999) - Franco
Uno su due (2006) - Giovanni
Concrete Romance (2007) - Pompo
Scontro di civiltà per un ascensore a Piazza Vittorio (2010) - Il Tassinaro
Tutti al mare (2011) - Alfredo
Fiabeschi torna a casa (2013)
Without Pity (2014) - Santili
Pasolini (2014) - Epifanio
Mio papà (2014) - Orso
Uno anzi due (2015) - Nando Scaratti
Natale a Londra – Dio salvi la regina (2016) - Er Duca
The Executrix (2017) - Rudolfo

Television
Le avventure di Calandrino e Buffalmaco (1975, TV Mini-Series)
Addavenì quel giorno e quella notte (1979, TV Mini-Series) - Er Samurai
Sogni e bisogni (1985, TV Mini-Series) - Er Caramella
La romana (1988, TV Mini-Series)
L'altro enigma (1988, TV Movie) - Il barbone
Il vigile urbano (1989)
L'avvocato porta (1997) - Remondino
La banda (2000, TV Movie)
Vite a prendere (2004, TV Movie) - Enrico Feroci

Sources

External links

1948 births
People from Calabria
Living people
People from the Province of Catanzaro
Italian male film actors
Nastro d'Argento winners
Italian male comedians
Bisexual male actors
Italian LGBT actors